Edith Mary Kemp-Welch (1870–1941) was a British artist, known as a portrait painter.

Biography
Edith Kemp-Welch grew up in Bournemouth and attended the Bournemouth School of Art before, in 1892, enlisting in the art school established by Hubert von Herkomer at Bushey in Hertfordshire. She continued to live in Bushey when her elder sister, Lucy Kemp-Welch, took over the running of the school. Between 1898 and 1940, Edith Kemp-Welch exhibited a total of 29 paintings, which were mostly portraits but also included at last one landscape, at the Royal Academy in London. During the First World War, both sisters produced recruiting posters for the British war effort. The poster created by Edith Kemp-Welch featured an image of Britannia with the slogan "Remember Scarborough ! Enlist Now", a reference to the war-time attack on Scarborough. Works by Kemp-Welch are held by the Imperial War Museum in London and by Bushey Museum and Art Gallery. Her cousin Margaret Kemp-Welch (1874–1968) was also an artist.

References

External links
 

1870 births
1941 deaths
19th-century English painters
19th-century English women artists
20th-century English painters
20th-century English women artists
English women painters
Artists from Bournemouth
People from Bushey
Sibling artists
World War I artists